The Omloop van Midden-België was a men's cycling race organized for the last time in 1979. The start and finish place was Lier, Belgium.

The competition's roll of honor includes the successes of Fred De Bruyne, Herman Van Springel and Willy Planckaert.

Winners

References 

Cycle races in Belgium
1948 establishments in Belgium
Defunct cycling races in Belgium
Recurring sporting events established in 1948
Recurring sporting events disestablished in 1979
1979 disestablishments